Moses "Whispering" Smith (January 25, 1932 – April 28, 1984) was an American blues harmonicist and singer. He recorded tracks including "A Thousand Miles from Nowhere" and "Texas Flood" and worked with Lightnin' Slim and with Silas Hogan. He was inducted into the Louisiana Blues Hall of Fame.

Biography
Smith was born in Union Church, Mississippi.

In the 1960s, Smith played harmonica on recordings by the swamp blues notables Lightnin' Slim and Silas Hogan, before he was able to record some tracks of his own. At this time he worked with the record producer J. D. "Jay" Miller, based in Crowley, Louisiana, and his recordings were released by Excello Records. His singles included the songs "Mean Woman Blues", and "Don't Leave Me Baby" and the B-side instrumental tracks "Live Jive" and "Hound Dog Twist".

Although he was a powerful singer and a straight but unsophisticated harmonica player, his success was diminished by his emergence when swamp blues was declining in popularity. He recorded his final solo album for Excello, Over Easy, in 1971. Two years later, he toured Europe as part of American Blues Legends '73, contributing two tracks to the Big Bear Records album of the same name.

Smith died in April 1984 in Baton Rouge, Louisiana, at the age of 52.

Discography

Singles

Albums

Compilation albums

See also
List of Louisiana blues musicians
List of swamp blues musicians

References

External links
 Illustrated "Whispering Smith" Discography
 

1932 births
1984 deaths
American blues harmonica players
Harmonica blues musicians
American blues singers
Songwriters from Mississippi
Blues musicians from Mississippi
Louisiana blues musicians
Swamp blues musicians
20th-century American singers
Songwriters from Louisiana
Singers from Louisiana
Excello Records artists
20th-century American male singers
American male songwriters